Lucy Russell may refer to:
Lucy Russell, Countess of Bedford (1580–1627), patron of the arts in the Elizabethan and Jacobean eras
Lucy Russell (actress) (born 1972), English actress